The Other Side of the Hedge is a 1911 narrative short story by E. M. Forster.  Written in the first-person, The Other Side of the Hedge concerns the efforts of a "modern day" person who is concerned and/or consumed with achieving the goals he has set out for himself while traveling along a road to what may be perceived as success.  He keeps close track of his progress along the road with the aid of his pedometer.

The story was included in The Celestial Omnibus, a short story collection by Forster published in 1911.

See also

 Gates of horn and ivory

External links
 The Other Side of the Hedge Full version of story.

1911 short stories
Short stories by E. M. Forster